Alejandro "Álex" Calvo Mata (born 20 February 2004) is a Spanish footballer who plays as a winger for Málaga CF.

Club career
Born in Córdoba, Andalusia, Calvo joined Málaga CF's youth setup in 2016, aged 13. He made his senior debut with the reserves on 8 December 2022, starting in a 0–0 Tercera Federación home draw against UD Torre del Mar.

Calvo made his first team debut on 11 March 2023; coming on as a late substitute for Lago Junior, he scored a late equalizer in a 2–2 Segunda División away draw against UD Las Palmas.

International career
On 21 February 2023, Calvo was called up to Spain under-19s, scoring on his debut against Norway two days later.

References

External links

2004 births
Living people
Footballers from Córdoba, Spain
Spanish footballers
Association football wingers
Segunda División players
Tercera Federación players
Atlético Malagueño players
Málaga CF players
Spain youth international footballers